Knife throwing is an art, sport, combat skill, or variously an entertainment technique, involving an artist skilled in the art of throwing knives, the weapons thrown, and a target. In some stage performances, the knife thrower ties an assistant to the target (sometimes known as a "target girl") and throws to miss them.

Basic principles
Knife throwing, whether in a martial or sport application, involves the same basic principles of mechanics. The objective in each case is for the point to stick into the target with a sufficient amount of force. For this to be successful, accuracy, distance, number of rotations and placement of the body all must be taken into account.

If the thrower uses a spin technique, the knife will rotate during flight. This means that the thrower, assuming they are throwing the same way every time, must either choose a specific distance for each type of throw or, more practically, make slight adjustments to the placement of the knife in the hand or to the throwing movement. Another adjustment that can be made is the way the knife is held. If it is held at the blade when it is thrown, this makes it spin half, whereas if it is held by the handle, this makes a full spin. So if the thrower estimates he needs one and a half spins for the point to hit the target, he would hold the knife from the blade when it is thrown. If he feels he needs two full spins for it to hit the target point-first, then it would be held by the handle.

With the much more intricate no-spin throwing techniques, the throwing motion is made as linear as possible, the knife's rotation being slowed even more by an index finger on the spine during release. Thrown no-spin, knives will make no revolution or only a quarter spin before reaching the target (point first), but no-spin throws are not as accurate or stable in flight as spin techniques. The knife does not need to be sharp to stick; as long as it has a point, it will stick into the target.

Sport

In the US and in many European countries, there are communities of people pursuing knife throwing as a sport, similar to archery. For example, in Europe more than 30 knife throwing clubs exist.

The competition itself consists, in the most common form, of a series of straight throws aimed at a set of standard wooden targets or in some cases foam. Similar to an archery target, competition knife throwing targets have a bullseye surrounded by one or more rings. A sticking knife scores points. The thrower must be standing at least a set distance away from the target, with higher distances for more challenging events. IKTHOF keeps a ranking of its members based on their performance during these sponsored competitions. EuroThrowers maintains a register of the world records, and for each championship publishes the full scores together with the meetings' reports.

History
As a performance art, knife throwing was popularized in the US in the late 19th century by traveling acts such as the Barnum & Bailey Circus, but has its roots in martial arts and hunting applications. It has been incorporated into the martial disciplines of the Japanese as well as African and Native American tribes. In Central Africa, they were used as weapons of war (thrown horizontally) as well as for ceremonial purposes. In medieval Europe Hans Talhoffer (c. 1410-1415 – after 1482) and Paulus Hector Mair (1517–1579) both mention throwing daggers in their treaties on combat and weapons. Talhoffer specifies a type of spiked dagger for throwing while Mair describes throwing the dagger at an opponent's chest.

Representations
The opera Queen of Knives, which premiered in Portland, Oregon on  May 7, 2010, tells the story of a brother and sister knife throwing act in the midst of the student protests in Birmingham in the early 1960s.

See also

 Impalement arts
 Axe throwing
 Throwing axe
 Throwing knife

Notes and references

Sources
Collins, Blackie. Knife Throwing-Sport – Survival – Defense. Knife World Publications, 1978.
Echanis, Michael D. Knife Fighting: Knife Throwing for Combat. Ohara Publications, 1978.
Führer, Dieter Guide to Knife & Axe Throwing. Schiffer Publishing, 2014.
Hibben, Gil. The Complete Gil Hibben Knife Throwing Guide. United Cutlery Corp., 1994. (ASIN-B0006FAV9E)
Madden, James W. The Art of Throwing Weapons. Patrick Publications, 1991.
McEvoy, Harry K. Knife Throwing: A Practical Guide. Charles E. Tuttle Company, Inc.,  1973.
McEvoy, Harry K. Knife and Tomahawk Throwing. Knife World Publications, 1985.
McEvoy, Harry K. Knife & Tomahawk Throwing-Art of the Experts. Charles E. Tuttle Company, Inc., 1988.
Moeller, Harald. Knifethrowing: The Viper Story. Lynclif Publishing, 1988.

External links
	 
Knife throwing techniques

Circus skills
Precision sports
Throwing weapons